Rififi in Tokyo (French: Rififi à Tokyo) is a 1963 French-Italian crime film directed by Jacques Deray and starring Karlheinz Böhm, Charles Vanel and Barbara Lass.

Synopsis
The veteran gangster Van Hekken arrives in Tokyo to pull off a heist of a precious diamond from a bank vault. However, when his planned second-in command is killed he has turn to the dead man's friend Carl Mersen.

Cast
 Karlheinz Böhm as Carl Mersen
 Charles Vanel as Van Hekken
 Barbara Lass as Françoise Merigné
 Keiko Kishi as Asami
 Michel Vitold as Pierre Merigné
 Eiji Okada as Danny Riquet
 Masao Oda as Kan
 Dante Maggio as Luigi
 Hideaki Suzuki as Itoushi
 Eijirô Yanagi as Ishimoto

References

Bibliography 
 Monaco, James. The Encyclopedia of Film. Perigee Books, 1991.

External links 
 

1963 films
1963 crime films
French crime films
Italian crime films
1960s French-language films
Films directed by Jacques Deray
Films based on works by Auguste Le Breton
Films with screenplays by José Giovanni
Films set in Tokyo
1960s French films
1960s Italian films